Dr. Reid Oliver is a fictional character from CBS's daytime drama As the World Turns. He was portrayed by Eric Sheffer Stevens and made his first appearance on January 19, 2010. Reid Oliver revealed himself to be gay on ATWT, adding to a list of fictional characters on the show that have been connected to Luke and Noah, the first teen same-sex couple in American soap history.

Character history

Luke Snyder
Reid arrives in Oakdale against his wishes after being blackmailed by Luke Snyder (played by Van Hansis) into performing a surgery on his long-time boyfriend Noah Mayer (Jake Silbermann) to help him regain his sight. Upon discovering that Noah would require complex surgery, Reid decides to return to his practice in Dallas. After an accident involving Luke's car and that of the wife of Chief of Medical staff at Memorial Hospital, Reid is ordered by the court not to leave Oakdale and is put under the care of Bob Hughes, the Chief of staff.

Reid Oliver is known for his arrogance, overconfidence and witty one-liners (though, in scenes with Luke, we learn that Reid is in fact quite vulnerable at times, feeling that Luke wants someone more like Noah, when Luke tries to help Reid improve his "people skills" to become Chief of Staff at Memorial Hospital after Bob Hughes steps down).

He quickly became good friends with Katie Peretti, moving in with her and her son, Jacob.

Now that supercouple Luke and Noah have broken up, and Luke will be working with Reid on a new neuro wing at the hospital, it has given them a chance to talk to each other more. There has been clear connections between the two and all sources lead to the fact that Reid and Luke will end up a couple, despite never wanting to admit their attractions.

On April 22, 2010, Reid and Luke shared their first kiss.

They have had many starts and stops, and have kissed many times since the first. The first time they were about to have sex,
Luke thought of Noah, who was in critical condition at the hospital and left. The second time Noah showed up at Luke's house,
and they stopped.

While meeting with a potential investor in the Oakdale Memorial at The Lake View, Noah punches Reid in the nose, which leads to Reid thinking he broke it. Earlier that day, Noah had told Reid they were finished as doctor and patient.

Luke and Reid went to the hospital to check on his nose; all was fine. Luke and Reid started talking some more and kissed just as Bob Hughes walked in.

Luke leaves the room and Bob asks Reid to tell him he did not just see that. Bob tells Reid that he can either keep his career or have a relationship with Luke, considering it is unethical for the top neurosurgeon to be dating the hospital's biggest donor. Reid decides to keep his job, telling Luke that after a few months and Bob's retirement, they can start their relationship up again. Luke refuses to wait around and storms off.

Reid realizes that he does not want to spend his life without Luke, so he resigns from the hospital. Luke and Reid begin their relationship, but Reid is still angry with Bob for making him choose between his job and Luke.

Chris Hughes' illness
Bob decides against letting Invicta buy Memorial, and Reid gets his job back. Bob also informs Reid that he wants to nominate him as Chief of Staff. Bob's son, Chris Hughes, is furious upon hearing this news. He decides that he wants to be Chief of Staff as well and he and Reid begin to clash as they fight for the position.

Chris is soon infected with a viral heart infection, which only Reid knows about after he walked in on Chris drawing his own blood. Reid begins to give Chris antibiotic injections, but feels uncomfortable with Chris's deception and attempts to stop, but Chris blackmails him. Reid tells Luke about Chris's condition and they both attempt to convince Chris to tell his family about his illness, but he refuses. Reid calls a cardiologist and former Oakdale resident, Dr. John Dixon, to consult on Chris's illness.

Chris continues to hide his illness from his family and refuses to cooperate with Dr. Dixon and Reid. After straining his heart while playing golf, Reid rushes Chris to the hospital and is finally forced to tell his family what is going on.

Katie, who is dating Chris, is devastated. Reid tells her that if she cannot handle it, go home - after Luke finally convinced her to come to the hospital. Luke follows Reid to Java, where he gets upset with him for being so closed-hearted and confesses that he told Noah that he is in love with Reid. When Luke tells Reid he can say it back, Reid insists that Luke would think he was just saying it to make him happy.

Dr. Dixon discovers that the damage to Chris's heart is irreversible and he will need a new heart. Chris's brother Tom starts to pull some strings to get Chris moved up on the transplant list. He finally manages to secure a heart in Bay City. However, another doctor at Bay City Hospital decides to keep the heart for one of his own patients.

Determined not to let another "arrogant, self-proclaimed savior of mankind" take the heart that is rightfully Chris's, Reid decides to go to Bay City himself to get the heart. Luke tries to talk him out of it, saying "I seem to remember another arrogant, self-proclaimed savior of mankind," to which Reid says, "I wonder what happened to him?" Luke follows Reid to the parking lot where Reid confesses that he is not just mad that another doctor is pulling rank, but that he really does care for the Hughes family and wants Chris to be okay. Luke wants to come with him, but Reid tells him to stay. Just before he leaves, Reid stops and tells Luke that he loves him.

Accident and death
On his way to Bay City, Reid approaches a railroad crossing and starts across before the gates close to try to save time as a train approaches. His car stalls on the tracks, but when Reid tries to escape, his seatbelt jams, trapping him inside. As the train hits him, he does not die on impact, but survives long enough to be at the hospital and say goodbye to Luke, give Luke "power of attorney" and tell a lawyer (Chris' brother) that his heart, if it is a match, goes to Chris. Luke, of course, does not want to admit that Reid is dying, but after discussing it with Bob and after Reid's brain functions cease, with only the machines keeping him alive, he agrees. He talks to the lawyer and Bob saying "if it's what Reid wanted..." then he signs the paper giving his consent for Reid's heart to be transplanted to Chris.

Right before they take Reid in for the transplant, Luke comes in and says his goodbyes. When the transplant is finished, he vows to Allison that he will not leave the hospital until he knows Chris will be okay. Holden and Lily, by this time, have heard about the accident and Luke has finally returned home after Chris woke up. They talk about funeral arrangements and discuss what to do with Reid's body. They have the funeral home director come over to talk and he is a homophobe, so Lily immediately orders him to leave, after the director says they need to find his closest living relative before they can do anything; it is the law. Holden and Lily then commence a search for Reid's uncle, whom they find, and he gives them his consent over "power of attorney." He also gives them a chess piece, which was the one that he gave to Reid when he lost his first chess game, to give to Luke. Lily and Holden return home and they decide to have Reid cremated, putting half of his ashes into the cornerstone of the new neuro-wing, and half of them to the Snyder's farm, where Luke puts them into the lake after saying "and the other half I brought to the farm, so you'll always be with me."

See also
Luke Snyder

External links
 www.ericshefferstevens.nl 
Getting to Know As the World Turns' Dr. Oliver
LukeAndReid.com, a Luke Snyder and Reid Oliver fan site

As the World Turns characters
Television characters introduced in 2010
Fictional gay males
Fictional physicians
Fictional neurosurgeons
Fictional LGBT characters in television
Male characters in television